Leon Errol (born Leonce Errol Sims, July 3, 1881 – October 12, 1951) was an Australian-American comedian and actor in the United States, popular in the first half of the 20th century for his appearances in vaudeville, on Broadway, and in films.

Early years
Born in Sydney to Joseph and Elizabeth Sims. Errol studied medicine at the University of Sydney. When he wrote material for, directed, and acted in the university's annual play, his interests changed to entertaining.

Career
Errol toured Australia, New Zealand and Great Britain and Ireland in a variety of theatrical settings, including circuses, operettas, and Shakespeare. According to his petition for naturalization (1914), he first came to the United States in 1898, having arrived at the Port of San Francisco. By 1905, in Portland, Oregon, he managed a touring vaudeville company troupe, giving an early boost to the career of a young comedian named Roscoe Arbuckle. In 1908, he made the United States his home.

By 1911 Errol had graduated to the New York big time in the 1911 Ziegfeld Follies on Broadway, notably in two skits with the legendary Bert Williams.  Errol's sister, Leda Errol (née Sims) was a personal friend of Ziegfeld Follies star Fanny Brice, and she appeared with him in the Ziegfeld Follies doing one- and two-act plays.  He appeared every year in the Follies through 1915, when he is also credited as director of the show   that included W. C. Fields, Ed Wynn, as well as Marion Davies as one of the Ziegfeld Girls.

While balancing vaudeville appearances and a dozen Broadway shows, like the original 1920 production of Jerome Kern's Sally, in 1919 Errol achieved the pinnacle of vaudeville success:  headlining at the Palace.

Films 

Errol made his first film, a comic short subject called Nearly Spliced, in 1916 (it was not released before 1921), for pioneering east-coast producer George Kleine. He left Broadway and went to Hollywood, appearing in Sally (1925). He was third-billed for Samuel Goldwyn's One Heavenly Night in 1931. The box-office for that film was disappointing, but overall Errol made a smooth transition to films in a variety of comedy roles. His comic trademark was a wobbly, unsteady walk, moving as though on rubber legs; this bit served him well in drunk routines.

Errol starred in a long string of two-reel comedy shorts, which began at Columbia Pictures in 1933. He also starred in two pioneering three-strip Technicolor shorts made at Warner Brothers, Service with a Smile (released July 28, 1934) and Good Morning, Eve! (September 22, 1934), the former beating the RKO Radio Pictures release La Cucaracha by five weeks as the first live action, all-Technicolor release.

Moving to RKO Radio Pictures in 1934, Leon Errol continued to make six shorts per year until his death in 1951. Most of these were marital farces in which Leon would get mixed up with a pretty girl or an involved business proposition, and face the wrath of his wife (usually Dorothy Granger); the theme song to the series was the nursery rhyme, London Bridge Is Falling Down.

Leon Errol is well remembered for his energetic performances in the Mexican Spitfire movies (1939-43) opposite Lupe Vélez; Errol had the recurring dual role of affable Uncle Matt and foggy British nobleman Lord Epping. Monogram Pictures signed Errol to appear as fight manager Knobby Walsh in eight of its "Joe Palooka" sports comedies (1946–50), one of which cast Errol as a thinly disguised version of Lord Epping. Errol's best known non-series appearance is in the nonsensical comedy feature Never Give a Sucker an Even Break (1941), released by Universal Pictures and starring fellow vaudeville and Ziegfeld alumnus W. C. Fields. Universal also kept Errol busy in 14 feature films.

On February 4, 1950, Errol appeared on television as a guest on The Ed Wynn Show, broadcast live to the West Coast on CBS (seen on kinescope film to the East and Midwest on February 18, 1950).  

Errol's next-to-last film, Lord Epping Returns (1951), reprised his famous characterization (and some of the gags) introduced in the 1939 feature Mexican Spitfire.

Footage from Errol's short subjects was incorporated into RKO's compilation features Variety Time, Make Mine Laughs, Footlight Varieties, and Merry Mirthquakes. RKO kept Leon Errol in the public eye by reissuing his older comedies throughout the 1950s. His RKO shorts soon became a staple of syndicated television.

Personal life
Errol married Stella Chatelaine in 1906 in Denver, Colorado. She died on November 7, 1946, in Los Angeles. Five years later Errol suffered a fatal heart attack, on October 12, 1951, aged 70. They had no children.

Recognition
Errol has a star at 6801 Hollywood Boulevard on the Hollywood Walk of Fame. It was dedicated on February 8, 1960.

Partial filmography 

 Yolanda (1924) - Innkeeper
 Sally (1925) - Duke of Checkergovinia
 Clothes Make the Pirate (1925) - Tremble-at-Evil Tidd
 The Lunatic at Large (1927) - Sam Smith
 Paramount on Parade (1930) - Leon Errol / Master of Ceremonies / (In a Hospital)
 Only Saps Work (1930) - James Wilson
 One Heavenly Night (1931) - Otto
 Finn and Hattie (1931) - Finley P. Haddock
 Her Majesty, Love (1931) - Baron von Schwarzdorf
 Alice in Wonderland (1933) - Uncle Gilbert
 We're Not Dressing (1934) - Hubert
 The Notorious Sophie Lang (1934) - Stubbs
 Service with a Smile (1934) - Walter Webb (Technicolor short subject)
 Good Morning, Eve! (1934) - Adam (Technicolor short subject)
 The Captain Hates the Sea (1934) - Layton
 Princess O'Hara (1935) - Last Card Louie
 Coronado (1935) - Otto Wray
 Should Wives Work? (1937) - Brennan
 The Girl from Mexico (1939) - Uncle Matthew "Matt" Lindsay (first of the Mexican Spitfire series)
 Career (1939) - Mudcat
 Dancing Co-Ed (1939) - 'Pops' Marlow
 Mexican Spitfire (1940) - Uncle Matt Lindsay / Lord Basil Epping
 Pop Always Pays (1940) - Henry Brewster
 The Golden Fleecing (1940) - Uncle Waldo Blake
 Mexican Spitfire Out West (1940) - Uncle Matt Lindsay / Lord Basil Epping
 Where Did You Get That Girl? (1941) - Alex MacDevin
 Six Lessons from Madame La Zonga (1941) - Mike Clancy / Papa Alvarez
 Hurry, Charlie, Hurry (1941) - Daniel Jennings Boone
 Moonlight in Hawaii (1941) - Walter Spencer
 Never Give a Sucker an Even Break (1941) - Leon, W. C. Fields's rival
 The Mexican Spitfire's Baby (1941) - Uncle Matt Lindsay / Lord Basil Epping
 Melody Lane (1941) - McKenzie
 Mexican Spitfire at Sea (1942) - Uncle Matt Lindsay / Lord Basil Epping
 Mexican Spitfire's Elephant (1942) - Uncle Matt Lindsay / Lord Basil Epping
 Strictly in the Groove (1942) - Carter B. Durham
 Follow the Band (1943) - Big Mike O'Brien
 Cowboy in Manhattan (1943) - Hank
 Gals, Incorporated (1943) - Cornelius Rensington III
 Mexican Spitfire's Blessed Event (1943) - Uncle Matt Lindsay / Lord Basil Epping
 Higher and Higher (1943) - Cyrus Drake
 Hat Check Honey (1944) - 'Happy' Dan Briggs
 Slightly Terrific (1944) - James P. Tuttle / John P. Tuttle
 Twilight on the Prairie (1944) - Cactus (ranch foreman)
 The Invisible Man's Revenge (1944) - Herbert
 Babes on Swing Street (1944) - Malcolm Curtis
 She Gets Her Man (1945) - Officer Mulligan
 Under Western Skies (1945) - Willie Wells
 What a Blonde (1945) - F. Farrington Fowler
 Mama Loves Papa (1945) - Wilbur Todd
 Riverboat Rhythm (1946) - Matt Lindsay
 Joe Palooka, Champ (1946) - Knobby Walsh
 Gentleman Joe Palooka (1946) - Knobby Walsh
 Joe Palooka in the Knockout (1947) - Knobby Walsh
 Joe Palooka in Fighting Mad (1948) - Knobby Walsh
 The Noose Hangs High (1948) - Julius Caesar 'J.C.' McBride
 Joe Palooka in the Big Fight (1949) - Knobby Walsh
 Joe Palooka in the Counterpunch (1949) - Knobby Walsh
 Joe Palooka Meets Humphrey (1950) - Knobby Walsh / Lord Cecil Poole
 Joe Palooka in Humphrey Takes a Chance (1950) - Knobby Walsh

References

External links

 

1881 births
1951 deaths
American male film actors
American male silent film actors
American burlesque performers
Vaudeville performers
20th-century American male actors
Male actors from Sydney
Australian emigrants to the United States
Burials at Forest Lawn Memorial Park (Glendale)
Eccentric dancers